The Ontario Soccer Association, founded in 1901, is one of the oldest and largest sport organizations in Canada. The OSA currently has more than 500,000 registered participants and provides development opportunities for players, coaches, referees, and administrators.

The OSA has its headquarters at The Ontario Soccer Centre in Vaughan. The OSA has 21 member District Associations ("Districts"). Each of these Districts has many Clubs as member organizations and there are approximately 900 Clubs province-wide. Leagues are also member organizations and can appear at any level of the organizations hierarchy.

Purpose
The essential purpose of The Association is to empower soccer and to collectively have a greater influence.

Profile

Founded: 1901
 
Affiliation: Canadian Soccer Association

President: Peter Augruso (Oct 2018 - Present)

Executive Director: Johnny Misley

Board of Directors: 12 Directors
 
District Presidents Forum: 21 Presidents

Members: 21 District Associations, 14 Associate Members

Players: 
2018 - 287,682 (outdoor) + 85,850 (indoor)

Coaches: 2006 - 22,000 (outdoor) + 3,700 (indoor)

Referees: 2018 - 8,617

Administrators: 2018 - 25,000

Total Participants: 2018 - 408,500

Corporate Divisions: The Soccer Centre (Ontario)

Annual Budget: Approximately $12 million

Full Time Employees: 42

Members
The OSA has five types of members:
 Active Members (District Associations)
 Associate Members (Organizations operating in more than one District)
 Professional soccer clubs operating in an International Professional League
 Life Members (an individual granted Life Membership in accordance with published rules)
 Honorary Members (an organization granted Honorary Membership in accordance with published rules)

There are currently 21 Active Members, 14 Associate Members (including 11 Leagues) and 11 Life Members.  There are no Professional Soccer Club Members and no Honorary Members.  The current Members are listed below by category.

District Associations:
Durham Region Soccer Association, East Central Ontario Soccer Association, Eastern Ontario District Soccer Association, Elgin Middlesex Soccer Association, Essex County Soccer Association, Hamilton and District Soccer Association, Huronia District Soccer Association, Lambton Kent Soccer Association, Niagara Soccer Association, North York Soccer Association, Peel Halton Soccer Association, Sault Amateur Soccer Association, Scarborough Soccer Association, Soccer North District Association, Soccer Northeastern Ontario, Soccer Northwest Ontario, Southeast Ontario Soccer Association, South-West Regional Soccer Association, Sudbury Regional Soccer Association, Toronto Soccer Association, York Region Soccer Association

Associate Members:
Central Girls Soccer League, Central Soccer League, East Region Soccer League, North Region Soccer League, Ontario Colleges Athletic Association, Ontario Indoor Soccer League, Ontario Soccer League, Ontario Soccer Referees’ Association, Ontario University Athletics, Ontario Women's Soccer League, Ontario Youth Soccer League, South Region Soccer League, Western Ontario Youth Soccer League,

Life Members:
Lois Brewer, Tom Doyle, Lewis Edwards, Jim Ellis, Edward Grenda, William Hoyle, Terence Kelly, George MacDonald, Alan Southard, Jack Strachan, Clive Wilkinson, Les Wilkinson

Committees

Committees:
Discipline & Appeals Committee, Executive Committee, Finance Committee, Futsal Committee, Indoor Soccer Rules Review Committee, League Management Committee, Central Region League Management Committee, East Region League Management Committee, North Region League Management Committee, South Region League Management Committee, West Region League Management Committee,
Ontario Cup Committee, Referee Development Committee, Staff Evaluation Committee, Technical Development Committee,

Task Forces:
Task Force on Facilities Development, Task Force on Governance, Task Force on Harassment & Volunteer Screening,

Advisory Groups:
Constitution Advisory Group, Medical Advisory Group

Ontario Player Development League
Launched in 2014 with the 2001 age group, the Ontario Player Development League (OPDL) is the province's first standards-based, youth high performance league that combines top level competition with strict high performance training standards. This exciting new youth high performance program is an important component of the overall movement to adopt the core principles of Long Term Player Development (LTPD) across soccer at large in Ontario and Canada. In 2015, OPDL will include the 2001 and 2002 age groups. In 2018, OPDL encompasses the U13 to U17 age categories, for both males and females.

Focusing on stages 4 (Train-To-Train) and 5 (Train-To-Compete) of the LTPD pathway, OPDL represents young players' early graduation to a genuine high performance training environment, targeting only the top athletes in the province from age groups U13 to U23 with what will be the highest level of competitive youth soccer in Ontario. Unlike other leagues, OPDL operates more as a high performance training program than merely a league.

In order to participate, clubs must apply for a license and meet strict criteria that show themselves to be worthy of training and developing the province's best. OPDL teams have a base level of training intensity and rigour akin to professional soccer environments that mean their players not only compete against the best, but train like the best. And importantly, teams are not promoted or relegated from the OPDL. Entry is decided on by the quality of the club, not the results on the field, allowing coaches to focus purely on developing their players.

The following organizations are license holders for the 2014 (U13) and 2015 (U13 & U14) Seasons.

 Aurora FC
 Burlington SC
 Glen Shields FC
 Hamilton United Elite SC
 Kleinburg Nobleton SC
 Markham SC
 Nepean Hotspurs SC
 North Toronto SC
 Ottawa South United SC
 Richmond Hill SC
 Unionville Milliken SC
 Pickering FC (formerly United FA)
 Vaughan SC
 West Ottawa SC
 Whitby Iroquois SC

Announced on August 11, 2015 the new OPDL members for the 2016 and 2017 season are:

 Athlete Institute FC
 North Mississauga SC
 Oakville SC
 SC Toronto

The following organizations have been approved as new OPDL license holders and will begin operation in 2018.  

 Brampton Youth SC
 Cambridge United
 Cumberland United
 London TFC Academy
 Tecumseh SC
 Toronto High Park FC
 Waterloo United
 Whitecaps London
 Woodbridge SC

Ontario Cup
Beginning in 1901, with the exception of 14 years during the war, the Ontario Cup has been Ontario's most prestigious award. The largest competition of its kind in Canada, the Ontario Cup is every Club's shared passion. No other sport boasts greater geographical representation in Ontario at more age levels and in both genders.

The Ontario Cup, the provincial soccer championships, has recently involved over 600 teams. The competition begins in May, and finishes with the Cup Finals in September to determine a championship team in each of the twenty two divisions: 
Under 12 Boys, Under 16 Boys Tier 2, Under 18 Boys, Under 12 Girls, Under 16 Girls, 
Under 13 Boys, Under 16 Boys Tier 1, Under 21 Men, Under 13 Girls, Under 17 Girls, Under 14 Boys, Under 17 Boys Tier 2, Men, Under 14 Girls, Under 18 Girls, Under 15 Boys Tier 2, Under 17 Boys Tier 1, Special Olympics, Under 15 Girls, Under 21 Women, Under 15 Boys Tier 1, Women

The Ontario Cup is open to any competitively registered team in Ontario. Entry Forms are available online in early March and the deadline for entering is the end of March.

In the Ontario Cup, youth age divisions, Under 12 to Under 18, play in Tournament Rounds which lead to Quarter-Finals, Semi-Finals and the Cup Finals. The Under 21 Men's and Under 21 Women's play a Single-Game Knock-out Format leading to the Semi-Finals and Cup Finals on one weekend in August. The Men's, Women's and Special Olympics' divisions play a Single-Game Knock-out Format leading to the Cup Finals in September.

National Championships take place in four age levels, Under 14, Under 16, Under 18 and Senior Open. The Ontario Cup winners in those age divisions advance to the National Championships which are usually played on Thanksgiving weekend in various provinces across Canada.

Coach Development Program
The Ontario Soccer Association's annual Coaching Conference was held on Saturday and the Club Head Coaches Workshop on Sunday at The Ontario Soccer Centre in Vaughan. Coaches were treated once again to a unique, entertaining and thought-provoking session focusing on 9 & 10 year olds by perennial guest, Tosh Farrell, Everton Football Club's Academy coach.

José Sulantay, renowned coach of Chile's FIFA U20 World Cup 2007 Canada Bronze medallist team and featured guest at this year's Coaching Conference demonstrated some of the coaching techniques which he used in preparing his talented squad for their World Cup campaign.

Jeff Pill, US Soccer National Staff Coach presented his thoughts on Coaching Methodology with a zonal defending session designed for today's youth game.

The OSA's Director of Player Development and Canada's Women's U17 Coach, Bryan Rosenfeld, closed off the on-field sessions presenting a high tempo session on goal-keepers.

In the course of the Coaching Conference proceedings, Martin Harvey received the Investor's Group Sport Award for Lifetime Volunteer Achievement on behalf of Charles Wyatt, President of the North Toronto Soccer Club and member of the Toronto Soccer Association Board of Directors.

The Club Head Coach Workshop on Sunday featured Tosh Farrell and José Sulantay as well as Peter Gooding, representing the National Soccer Coaches Association of America (NSCAA). His presentation and discussion focused on the development of an International Coaching Education Partnership with the NSCAA and how such a relationship would be beneficial for coaching education in Ontario.

Player Development Program

The selection process for Canada's National Teams relies heavily on the Provincial Player Development Programs. Many National players are first identified representing their Provinces at the annual U14 and U16 National All-Star Championships.

With Ontario representing 45.0% of Canada's playing population, the Province has always had a very high representation of players on National Teams.

Provincial development in Ontario begins at the U13 age category via the Regional Development Program. Every September the Regional U13 boys and girls teams compete at the Provincial Identification Camp. The best players from this tournament are selected to progress to the U14 Provincial Development Program. The intent of this program is to fulfill the soccer aspirations of those young players who have ability and desire to play at a higher level.

It is important that parents and coaches are aware and understand the Ontario Soccer Development Structure. At U12 the District players are identified and brought into train with the Regional Staff as they prepare to compete each September / October at the District I.D. Tournament within their Region where they are scouted by the Regional Coaches.

At U13, Regional Coaches scout through the District I.D. process and through Club Head Coach recommendations, select and prepare Regional Squads to compete in the U13 Regional I.D. Camp held every September at the Soccer Centre. Provincial Coaches and Scouts select, based on technical and tactical skill, the best prospects for inclusion in the U14 Provincial Development Program. Development Squads of approximately fifty girls and boys are selected for further screening with this number being reduced to thirty in each group by November. The final group of players report to the Soccer Centre on a regular basis for training with the U14 Program training four times weekly from October through to May at which time the U14's return to their Club Programs. The U15 and U16 Programs also commence in October and like the U14's train four times weekly through to the end of April, after which they also return to their Club Programs.

The U14 and U16 Programs conduct a week-long training camp one week prior to the National All-Star Championships held at the end of July. It is at the All-Star Championships that the Canadian National Coaches scout for players.

Ontario Regional Excel (REX)

The Canadian Soccer Association partnered with Ontario Soccer, Own the Podium, Sport Canada, the Canadian Sport Institute Ontario, and Bill Crothers Secondary School in Markham Ontario, to launch its Regional EXCEL (REX) program in January 2018. The REX Super Centres provide top youth female players with a centralized, daily training program to develop their skills for players from U14 to U18 as part of Canada Soccer's Long-Term Player Development (LTPD) program.

Match Officials Development Program
The Match Officials Development Program of The Ontario Soccer Association has as its mission, "To prepare and certify Match Officials for the club, district, regional and provincial levels of the game". To this end, the training and support provided to leaders such as Club Head Referees, District Referee Coordinators, Instructors, and Evaluators is an ongoing activity intended to enable these leaders to assist with training and developing Match Officials in communities across the Province.

Due to the COVID-19 pandemic, Ontario Soccer migrated all certification courses to an online format starting with the 2021 season.  This format has several components:
 Approximately 10 self-guided online modules;
 A mandatory 2 hour webinar, lead by the elite instructors of the province consisting of former FIFA, National and Provincial Match Officials;
 Complete an open-book online exam, varying in length based on whether taking a Small-sided or Full field certification course;
 Participate in a 4 hour practical on-field session, lead by a Provincial Match Official Development Officer;
 Complete a 30-minute "Signals" test after the on-field session.

Individuals who are 12 years of age or older, as of April 1 of the current registration year, are welcome to take the Small-Sided Match Official training course.  At the conclusion of the course, Match Officials receive an Ontario Soccer badge and are certified to officiate small-sided (7v7) matches.  All persons aged 14 and above, as of April 1 of the registration year, are encouraged to take the Entry Level (11v11) course.

Grading is based on a 1-12 scale, with new small-sided Match Officials beginning in levels 1-3 based on their age.  Entry Level (full field) Match Officials begin their careers at Level 4, and are able to be used by both Clubs and Districts when assigning matches.  After 1 full season, all Match Officials are automatically promoted to the next grade above, provided they meet the requirements of that grade.  A Match Official can then, through both physical and knowledge testing as well as performance assessments, elevate themselves to elevated grades and greater opportunities.  The highest grade at the Provincial Level (Level 10) will allow a Match Official to be considered for Canadian Premier League assignments.  Levels 11 and 12 are administered by Canada Soccer and FIFA, respectively.

Ontario Soccer began in 2022 a media campaign called "No Ref, No Game", reminding spectators, coaches and players that Match Officials give respect to them and expect it to be returned.  According to comparative data, Match Official registration and retention was 40% of 2019 levels, resulting in the deployment of a 1+1 system for District Recreational leagues which traditionally had 3 or 4 Match Officials assigned.

The Soccer Centre

The Soccer Centre is Canada's leading competition, training, education, and exposition soccer facility. The site is like no other in Canada. It features a  field house that can accommodate three indoor soccer fields or one full size 11-a-side game. It has two international size outdoor grass fields, one international size outdoor artificial turf field, a sports therapy clinic, a restaurant and lounge, and is located on a  parcel of land that is easily accessible from Ontario's major highways. Tenants include The Ontario Soccer Association, The Canadian Soccer Association, The Soccer Hall of Fame and Museum, and all of Ontario's Provincial Leagues.

FieldTurf Fields:

In the fall of 2003, The Soccer Centre opened up its new artificial turf outdoor field. The project not only involved the installation of FieldTurf, which is an artificial surface that feels and plays like natural grass, but also the installation of lights and two new change rooms. This new field will dramatically expand the outdoor playing season and eliminate the need to cancel games because of poor weather conditions. The project was the result of a collaboration between The Ontario Soccer Association, The Canadian Soccer Association, The Soccer Centre, and The City of Vaughan, and the beneficiaries of this collaboration will range from the elite national player to the individual that simply wants to play in a recreational game.  The playing surface is 105 metres long by 68 metres wide. There is a spectator area that currently can accommodate 200 individuals, however, this number will be increased for the 2004 outdoor season.

In August 2015, the Ontario Soccer Association hosted a grand opening for the new Ontario Soccer Centre Stadium.  The new outdoor facility has bleacher seating to accommodate up to 2000 spectators, and a FIFA 2-star quality turf (designation for professional-level soccer fields).  The new stadium is home to Toronto FC's USL team, Toronto FC II. .  Along with the new stadium, the Ontario Soccer Centre also upgraded its indoor facility to have a FIFA 2-star quality turf.

Play Soccer
Play Soccer Presented by Rogers is a service of The Ontario Soccer Association which supports programs of The Ontario Soccer Association, Clubs and Leagues. The Ontario Soccer Association launched Play Soccer Presented by Rogers in June 2006 to promote the sport of soccer from the grassroots level through to the professional arena.

References

External links
All of the above-mentioned information has been copied directly from the OSA website.
 The Ontario Soccer Association - Official website
 Kleinburg Nobleton Soccer Club (in Vaughan, York Region) www.KNSC.ca

 
Soccer governing bodies in Canada
1901 establishments in Ontario
Soccer
Sports organizations established in 1901